The 1988–89 Stuttgarter Kickers season is the 89th season in the club's football history. In 1988–89 the club play in the Bundesliga, the first tier of German football. It is the club's first season in this league, having been promoted from the 2. Bundesliga in 1988. The club also takes part in the 1988–89 edition of the DFB-Pokal.

Squad information

Squad and statistics

External links
 1988-89 Stuttgarter Kickers season at Kickersarchiv.de 
 1988–89 Stuttgarter Kickers season at Weltfussball.de 
 1988–89 Stuttgarter Kickers season at kicker.de 
 1988–89 Stuttgarter Kickers season at Fussballdaten.de 

Stuttgarter Kickers
Stuttgarter Kickers seasons